The 42nd General Assembly of Nova Scotia represented Nova Scotia between February 19, 1942, and September 12, 1945.

Division of seats

There were 30 members of the General Assembly, elected in the 1941 Nova Scotia general election.

List of members

Former members of the 42nd General Assembly

References 

 Canadian Parliamentary Guide, 1945, AL Normandin

Terms of the General Assembly of Nova Scotia
1941 establishments in Nova Scotia
1945 disestablishments in Nova Scotia
20th century in Nova Scotia